Nils Christiansen (8 July 1913 – 15 July 1988) was a Filipino-American swimmer. He competed in two events at the 1936 Summer Olympics.

References

External links
 

1913 births
1988 deaths
Filipino male swimmers
Olympic swimmers of the Philippines
Swimmers at the 1936 Summer Olympics
Sportspeople from Batangas
Filipino people of American descent
Filipino emigrants to the United States
Colorado School of Mines alumni